Tiscali Village is an archaeological site situated in Sardinia, in the comune of Dorgali.

It is situated within a large cave in Monte Tiscali. It consists of the remains of a number of round dwellings dating from the first millennium BC.

The site was re-discovered a little over a century ago and was first documented by the Italian historian Ettore Pais in 1910  and then in greater detail by Antonio Taramelli in 1927.  There was a short excavation campaign in 2000 by the Soprintendenza per i Beni Archeologici per le Provincie di Sassari e Nuoro.

Telecommunications company Tiscali took its name from the site.

External links
Dorgali, villaggio di Tiscali

References 

Buildings and structures in Sardinia
Archaeological sites in Sardinia
Former populated places in Italy
Tourist attractions in Sardinia